A Muslim immigration ban is a ban, either absolute or from specific nations, on the immigration of Muslims to a specific nation.

United States

On December 7, 2015, presidential candidate Donald Trump called for "a total and complete shutdown of Muslims entering the United States until our country's representatives can figure out what the hell is going on." The Muslim immigration ban has been seen as a result of the influence of the counter-jihad movement.

As President, Trump signed Executive Order 13769 on January 27, 2017, the first travel ban, which "suspended for 90 days the entry of certain aliens from seven countries: Iran, Iraq, Libya, Somalia, Sudan, Syria, and Yemen." Further executive orders and presidential proclamations removed some of these countries and added others, including non-Muslim majority countries.

Formerly, the Naturalization Act of 1790 did not restrict immigration of Muslims, but indirectly prevented Muslim immigrants from obtaining citizenship, which was limited to any "free white person". Whiteness was associated with Christianity by the American courts, until the decision Ex Parte Mohriez recognized citizenship for a Saudi Muslim man in 1944.

Australia
A 2016 poll found that half of all Australians wanted to ban Muslim immigration, with 49% of Australians supporting a ban. In a 2017 poll of 2,000 people, 48% backed a ban, 27% were undecided, and a quarter opposed it.

In 2017, Senator and One Nation leader Pauline Hanson after the London terror attack called for a Muslim immigration ban, saying "do not pray for London, pray for Muslim ban". This came one year after her maiden speech called for the same Ban.

In 2018, Senator Fraser Anning during his maiden speech called for a plebiscite to reintroduce the White Australia Policy, especially with regard to excluding Muslims.

India
Before he became the Chief Minister of Uttar Pradesh in 2017, minister Yogi Adityanath praised former U.S. President Trump's position on a Muslim immigration ban and stated that “similar action[s] [are] needed to contain terror activities in this country.”

Netherlands
Geert Wilders is a prominent advocate for a ban on immigration from Muslim nations in the Netherlands.

Russia
Long time Russian leader of Liberal Democratic Party of Russia, Vladimir Zhirinovsky has called for a ban on Muslim immigration.

References

Counter-jihad
Anti-Islam sentiment
Trump administration controversies
Anti-Islam sentiment in the United States
Executive orders of Donald Trump
Immigration bans